Caryatis phileta is a moth of the subfamily Arctiinae. It was described by Dru Drury in 1782. It is found in Cameroon, the Democratic Republic of the Congo, Gabon, Ghana, Nigeria and Sierra Leone.

Description
The moth's Antennae are black and setaceous. Its thorax is red, spotted, and striped with black. Its abdomen is yellow, with black streaks crossing it. The anterior wings are sooty black, with a white band crossing each from the anterior edges to the lower corners. Their posterior wings are yellow, with a black border running along the external edges.

Underside: Head and neck red. Legs streaked black and white. Breast and abdomen yellow, the latter spotted with black on each side. Wings coloured as on the upperside. Margins of the wings entire. Wingspan  inches (57 mm).

References

Moths described in 1782
Nyctemerina
Insects of Cameroon
Moths of Africa
Insects of the Democratic Republic of the Congo
Insects of West Africa
Fauna of Gabon